Chandana may refer to

Chandanavana, native name for Kannada cinema
Chandana Bauri, Indian politician
Chandana Sharma, Indian actress
DD Chandana, Kannada Television channel
K. Chandana (died 2008), Sri Lankan army soldier
Upul Chandana (born 1972), Sri Lankan cricketer
An Indian word meaning Sandalwood paste